The Mirror is a 1999 Hong Kong horror anthology film directed by Siu Wing, produced and written by Raymond Wong, and starring Nicholas Tse, Ruby Lin, Lillian Ho, Law Lan, Jack Neo, Xu Fan and Sherming Yiu.

Plot
The film is divided into five unrelated segments with the mirror on an antique dressing table serving as the plot device.

The first segment is set in a brothel in 16th-century China. A courtesan is murdered and her blood spills onto the mirror on her dressing table.

The second segment is set in Shanghai in 1922. Mary, an heiress to a large mansion, receives an antique dressing table as a birthday gift. She notices that there is something strange about the mirror and starts receiving eerie phone calls reminding her about her dark secrets in the past. She had an affair with a professor who already had a family. In order to silence him and take over his mansion, she poisoned him to death. One night, her two servants confront her, tell her that they are actually the professor's daughters, and avenge their father.

The third segment is set in Singapore in 1988 during the Ghost Festival. James, a lawyer, has a one-night stand with Lora and tries to get away in the morning but her burly Teochew-speaking brother Roman, stops him and forces him to marry Lora. Lora moves into James's house and brings along an antique dressing table that she inherited from her deceased parents. One day, a woman approaches James and offers him a million dollars to defend her son, who has been accused of raping a lady and murdering her boyfriend. Overcome by greed, James ignores his conscience, defends the accused in court, and wins the case. James gets into a car accident later and his face is injured so badly that he has to undergo reconstructive surgery. When the bandages are removed, James is horrified to see that he now looks exactly like the rape victim's deceased boyfriend.

The fourth segment is set in Hong Kong in 1999. An old woman and her granddaughter Yu are waiting for the latter's cousin Ming to come home from his overseas studies. When Ming returns, he brings along his girlfriend, Judy, and announces his decision to marry her. Yu becomes very jealous because she is in love with Ming. One day, Ming and Judy purchase an antique dressing table from a shop and bring it home. Yu finds the mirror very weird and starts feeling uneasy. Judy's pet puppy also keeps barking at her. One night, the puppy is brutally killed, and Ming's grandmother goes missing on the following night. Ming's grandmother is eventually found dead with her body dismembered. Yu is blamed for the murder and gets arrested by the police. Later, Ming brings Judy to the mirror and tells her that he knows she murdered his grandmother so that she could inherit his grandmother's fortune. Judy reveals her true colours and tries to kill Ming but misses her step and ends up impaling herself on a pair of scissors stuck to the dressing table.

The fifth segment is set in Taiwan in 2000. A woman approaches the antique dressing table and sees her eyeballs falling out from their sockets in her reflection in the mirror.

Cast
 In order of appearance:
 Sherming Yiu as courtesan
 Xu Fan as Mary
 Li Zhirui as dumb girl
 Chen Shasha as Mary's housekeeper
 Jack Neo as James
 Lynn Poh as Lora
 John Cheng as Roman
 Karen Tong as rape victim
 Lin Ruping as accused's mother
 Raymond Wong as rape victim's boyfriend
 Lillian Ho as Yu
 Law Lan as Ming's grandmother
 Nicholas Tse as Ming
 Ruby Lin as Judy

External links 
 
 

1999 films
1999 horror films
Hong Kong supernatural horror films
Horror anthology films
Hong Kong ghost films
1990s Cantonese-language films
Films set in 1922
Films set in 1988
Films set in 1999
Films set in 2000
Films set in Hong Kong
Films shot in Hong Kong
Films set in Singapore
Films shot in Singapore
Films set in Taiwan
Films set in Shanghai
1990s Hong Kong films